James Lisle Gillis (October 2, 1792 – July 8, 1881) was a Democratic member of the U.S. House of Representatives from Pennsylvania.

Biography
James L. Gillis was born in Hebron, New York.  He attended the public schools and became a tanner.  He served in the War of 1812.  He moved to Ridgway, Pennsylvania, in 1822, and was appointed associate judge of Jefferson County, Pennsylvania, by Governor David R. Porter.  He was a member of the Pennsylvania House of Representatives in 1840 and 1851.  He was one of the judges of Jefferson County in 1842, and a member of the Pennsylvania State Senate in 1845.  Gillis also served as a mail agent in San Francisco, California.

Gillis was elected as a Democrat to the Thirty-fifth Congress.  He was an unsuccessful candidate for reelection in 1858.  He was appointed agent for the Pawnee Tribe of Indians.  He died in Mount Pleasant, Iowa, in 1881.  Interment in Forest Home Cemetery.

Sources

The Political Graveyard

1792 births
1881 deaths
Democratic Party Pennsylvania state senators
Democratic Party members of the Pennsylvania House of Representatives
Pennsylvania lawyers
Pennsylvania state court judges
American military personnel of the War of 1812
Democratic Party members of the United States House of Representatives from Pennsylvania
People from Hebron, New York
People from Jefferson County, Pennsylvania
19th-century American judges